Shelly Manne & His Men Play Peter Gunn is an album by drummer Shelly Manne's group Shelly Manne & His Men performing Henry Mancini's score from the TV show Peter Gunn. It was recorded in 1959 and released on the Contemporary label.

Reception

The AllMusic review by Scott Yanow states: "Mancini encouraged Manne to use the songs as vehicles for extended solos, and the results are swinging, standing apart from the show. Candoli and particularly Geller are in top form on this fairly memorable effort".

Track listing
All compositions by Henry Mancini
 "Peter Gunn" - 2:12
 "The Floater" - 4:29
 "Sorta Blue" - 4:10
 "The Brothers" - 4:24
 "Soft Sounds" - 4:16
 "Fallout" - 4:34
 "Slow and Easy" - 5:56
 "Brief and Breezy" - 4:03
 "Dreamsville" - 3:50
 "A Profound Gass" - 3:48

Personnel
Shelly Manne - drums
Conte Candoli - trumpet
Herb Geller - alto saxophone
Victor Feldman - vibraphone, marimba
Russ Freeman - piano
Monty Budwig - bass
Henry Mancini - arranger

References

1959 albums
Contemporary Records albums
Shelly Manne albums